Bhale Krishnudu is a comedy-drama Telugu film starring Krishna. Krishna is the son of millionaire Madhav Rao. Madhav Rao's partners cheat him, which leads to his death. Krishna then has to take care of his family as well as avenge his father's death.

Plot
Krishna is a son of rich person, played by Jaggayya, and Anjali Devi is his mother. Krishna is a happy-go-lucky guy who enjoys himself with his friends by giving them money for their needs and loves Sangeeta. He accidentally meets Jaya Prada, a village girl and teases her. One day Nagabhushanam, the secretary of Jaggayya tricks him and makes him sign his property papers to his name and it leads to the death of Jaggayya. Krishna's family was dragged to the road by Nagabhushanam and his allies Mohan Babu and Allu Ramalingaiah. Krishna's friends shows him empty hands when he asks their help and Sangeeta leaves him when he loses his property. Krishna starts doing daily labour to run his family with the help of Jaya Prada, who shows him the job and there he meets Satyanarayana, who tells Krishna the truth behind his families present situation and asks him to punish Nagabushanam for his actions. The rest of the story is how Krishna and Jaya Prada, with the help of Satyanarayana defeat Nagabhshanam  and get back their property by falsifying their identity.

Cast

Soundtrack
All the songs were written by Aatreya and Veturi. All the songs were sung by P. Susheela and S. P. Balasubrahmanyam.

 "Ponna Chettu Needalo"
 "Brundavanamoka"
 "Evaru Nuvvu"
 "Muddante Vaddanake"
 "Mogali Motaga Dolu Sannayi"
 "Itikimeeda Itikeste"

References

External links

1980 films
Films directed by K. Raghavendra Rao
Films scored by K. Chakravarthy
1980s Telugu-language films